The 1953–54 DDR-Oberliga was the fifth season of the DDR-Oberliga, the first tier of league football in East Germany. 

The league was contested by fifteen teams, two less than in the previous season, and BSG Turbine Erfurt won the championship. It was the first of two championships for the club, winning it the following season as well.

Heinz Satrapa of BSG Wismut Aue was the league's top scorer with 21 goals.

The 1953–54 season saw the best-ever average support for the Oberliga with 14,005 spectators per game.

Table									
The 1953–54 season saw two newly promoted clubs, Fortschritt Meerane and Einheit Ost Leipzig. The FDGB-Pokal was won by second division DDR-Liga club ZSK Vorwärts Berlin.

Results

References

Sources

External links
 Das Deutsche Fussball Archiv  Historic German league tables

1953-54
Ober
1953–54 in East German football